The health effects of chocolate are the possible effects on health of consuming chocolate, mainly over the long term. Commonly consumed chocolate is high in fat and sugar, which are associated with an increased risk for obesity when consumed in excess. Depending on the cocoa content, chocolate can contain variable amounts of other compounds, such as polyphenols, in particular flavan-3-ols, and theobromine. Clinical research studies are insufficient to confirm an effect of chocolate on long-term health.

History
Theobroma cacao, the cacao tree, produces seeds containing flavanols. The seeds were used to make beverages over some 2000 years in Aztec, Olmec, and Maya civilizations in Central and South America. The drinks were ascribed various curative and stimulant properties, unsupported by experimental evidence. In the 19th century, chocolate as a solid was invented, and milk and sugar were added to create milk chocolate, which is high in fat and sugar. 

Throughout history, numerous beneficial effects have been attributed to chocolate consumption, although none has been substantiated. Doubtful research, sometimes funded by the chocolate industry, has at times made suggestions of possible health benefits for these products. This is often based on an unwarranted extrapolation of in vitro studies of isolated compounds in cocoa products.

Phytochemicals

Chocolate contains polyphenols, especially flavan-3-ols (catechins) and smaller amounts of other flavonoids, which are under study for their potential effects in the body. The following table shows the content of polyphenols and theobromine in various preparations of chocolate.

Lead content
Although research suggests that even low levels of lead in the body may be harmful to children, it is unlikely that chocolate consumption in small amounts causes lead poisoning. Some studies have shown that lead may bind to cocoa shells, and contamination may occur during the manufacturing process. One study showed the mean lead level in milk chocolate candy bars was 0.027 µg lead per gram of candy; another study found that some chocolate purchased at U.S. supermarkets contained up to 0.965  µg per gram, close to the international (voluntary) standard limit for lead in cocoa powder or beans, which is 1 µg of lead per gram. In 2006, the U.S. FDA lowered by one-fifth the amount of lead permissible in candy, but compliance is only voluntary. Studies concluded that "children, who are big consumers of chocolates, may be at risk of exceeding the daily limit of lead; whereas one 10 g cube of dark chocolate may contain as much as 20% of the daily lead oral limit. "Moreover chocolate may not be the only source of lead in their nutrition" and "chocolate might be a significant source of cadmium and lead ingestion, particularly for children."

Cadmium content
The European Food Safety Authority recommended a tolerable weekly intake for cadmium of 2.5 micrograms per kg of body weight for Europeans, indicating that consuming chocolate products caused exposure of about 4% among all foods eaten. 1986 California Proposition 65 requires a warning label on chocolate products having more than 4.1 mg of cadmium per daily serving of a single product.

Non-human animals

In sufficient amounts, the theobromine found in chocolate is toxic to animals such as cats, dogs, horses, parrots, and small rodents because they are unable to metabolise the chemical effectively. If animals are fed chocolate, the theobromine may remain in the circulation for up to 20 hours, possibly causing epileptic seizures, heart attacks, internal bleeding, and eventually death. Medical treatment performed by a veterinarian involves inducing vomiting within two hours of ingestion and administration of benzodiazepines or barbiturates for seizures, antiarrhythmics for heart arrhythmias, and fluid diuresis.

Dark chocolate has 2 to 5 times more theobromine and thus is more dangerous to dogs. According to the Merck Veterinary Manual, approximately 1.3 grams of baker's chocolate per kilogram of a dog's body weight (0.02 oz/lb) is sufficient to cause symptoms of toxicity. For example, a typical  baker's chocolate bar would be enough to bring about symptoms in a  dog. In the 20th century, there were reports that mulch made from cacao bean shells is dangerous to dogs and livestock.

Research

Acne
Overall evidence is insufficient to determine the relationship between chocolate consumption and acne. Various studies point not to chocolate, but to the high glycemic nature of certain foods, like sugar, corn syrup, and other simple carbohydrates, as potential causes of acne, along with other possible dietary factors.

Addiction

Food, including chocolate, is not typically viewed as addictive. Some people, however, may want or crave chocolate, leading to a self-described term, chocoholic.

Mood
By some popular myths, chocolate is considered to be a mood enhancer, such as by increasing sex drive or stimulating cognition, but there is little scientific evidence that such effects are consistent among all chocolate consumers. If mood improvement from eating chocolate occurs, there is not enough research to indicate whether it results from the favorable flavor or from the stimulant effects of its constituents, such as caffeine, theobromine, or their parent molecule, methylxanthine. A 2019 review reported that chocolate consumption does not improve depressive mood.

Heart and blood vessels
Reviews support a short-term effect of lowering blood pressure by consuming cocoa products, but there is no evidence of long-term cardiovascular health benefit. While daily consumption of cocoa flavanols (minimum dose of 200 mg) appears to benefit platelet and vascular function, there is no good evidence to support an effect on heart attacks or strokes.

References

Chocolate
Components of chocolate
Chocolate
Veterinary toxicology